{{DISPLAYTITLE:Cav1.1}}

Cav1.1 also known as the calcium channel, voltage-dependent, L type, alpha 1S subunit, (CACNA1S), is a protein which in humans is encoded by the CACNA1S gene. It is also known as CACNL1A3 and the dihydropyridine receptor (DHPR, so named due to the blocking action DHP has on it).

Function 
This gene encodes one of the five subunits of the slowly inactivating L-type voltage-dependent calcium channel in skeletal muscle cells. Mutations in this gene have been associated with hypokalemic periodic paralysis, thyrotoxic periodic paralysis and malignant hyperthermia susceptibility.

Cav1.1 is a voltage-dependent calcium channel found in the transverse tubule of muscles. In skeletal muscle it associates with the ryanodine receptor RyR1 of the sarcoplasmic reticulum via a mechanical linkage. It senses the voltage change caused by the end-plate potential from nervous stimulation and propagated by sodium channels as action potentials to the T-tubules. It was previously thought that when the muscle depolarises, the calcium channel opens, allowing calcium in and activating RyR1, which mediates much greater calcium release from the sarcoplasmic reticulum. This is the first part of the process of excitation-contraction coupling, which ultimately causes the muscle to contract. Calcium entry through Cav1.1 is not required in skeletal muscle, as it is in cardiac muscle; Cav1.1 undergoes a conformational change which allosterically activates RyR1.

Clinical significance
In hypokalemic periodic paralysis (HOKPP), the voltage sensors in domains 2 and 4 of Cav1.1 are mutated (loss-of-function), reducing the availability of the channel to sense depolarisation, and therefore it cannot activate the ryanodine receptor as efficiently. As a result, the muscle cannot contract very well and the patient is paralysed. The condition is hypokalemic because a low extracellular potassium ion concentration will cause the muscle to repolarise to the resting potential more quickly, so any calcium conductance that does occur cannot be sustained. It becomes more difficult to reach the threshold at which the muscle can contract, and even if this is reached then the muscle is more prone to relaxing. Because of this, the severity would be reduced if potassium ion concentrations are maintained. In contrast, hyperkalemic periodic paralysis refers to gain-of-function mutations in sodium channels that maintain muscle depolarisation and therefore are aggravated by high potassium ion concentrations.

The European Malignant Hyperthermia Group accepts two mutations in CACNA1S as diagnostic for malignant hyperthermia.

Blockers
Cav1.1 is blocked by dihydropyridine.

See also 
 Calcium channel

References

Further reading

External links 
  GeneReviews/NCBI/NIH/UW entry on Malignant Hyperthermia Susceptibility
 

Ion channels